An airshed is a part of the atmosphere that behaves in a coherent way with respect to the dispersion of emissions. Alternatively, an airshed is a geographical area where local topography and meteorology limit the dispersion of pollutants away from the area. They are formed by air masses moving across a landscape where they influence atmospheric composition. Their boundaries are loosely defined, but they can be quantified.

References

External links
 Georgia Basin-Puget Sound International Airshed Strategy

Meteorological phenomena